Sigurd Björling (2 November 1907 - 8 April 1983) was a Swedish operatic baritone.

He made his debut as Alfio in Cavalleria Rusticana in 1935 at Royal Swedish Opera. He specialized in Wagnerian roles, among them Wotan, Telramund, Amfortas, Hans Sachs and Kurwenal.
His United States debut came on October 3, 1950, in San Francisco (as Kurwenal), and next year he was the first postwar-Wotan at the Bayreuth Festival. On November 15, 1952, he made his debut at the Metropolitan Opera, singing there for a full season. He sang his last performance in 1974. He appeared in the 1979 film Kejsaren.

References

1907 births
1983 deaths
Swedish operatic baritones
20th-century Swedish  male opera singers